Kishangarh is an Urban village. The Village is located near Vasant Kunj in South West Delhi district of Delhi, India, on the hills of Aravali, between Mehrauli and Vasant Kunj. One extreme of Kishangarh is around 4 km from Qutub Minar in historic Mehrauli area. The other extreme is approximately 7.5 km from the Indira Gandhi International Airport. Munirka is about 5 km, where the Aruna Asaf Ali Marg, connecting the main Vasant Kunj Marg with the Outer Ring Road forms its western boundary.

Kishangarh comes under South Delhi Municipal Corporation (SDMC) Mehrauli (Ward Name), 068-S (Ward Number). and the Mehrauli and there is no panchayat system in the village

Geography and climate
Kishangarh lies in the South West district of Delhi and, like the rest of the city, has a semi-arid climate with a significant difference between summer and winter temperatures. While the summer temperatures may go up to 46 °C, the winters can seem freezing to people used to a warm climate with near 2.5 °C.

The soil of Kishangarh consists of sandy loam to loam texture. The water level has gone down in the recent past hovering between 45 m to 50 m due to rise in population.

Notable Persons
1) Ishwar Singh Gandas Bhattewala (1945-2005) (Khap Pardhan 360 Mehrauli) from Kishangarh Village 

2) Mahendra Singh Bhattewala (Mla Mahipalpur Vidhansabha Delhi 1998) from Kishangarh Village 

3) Gordhan Singh Gandas Bhattewala (Khap Pardhan 360 Mehrauli) from Kishangarh Village

Public Transport 
Nearest Metro Station :
 Chhatarpur (Delhi Metro) Station on Yellow Line.
Delhi Transport Corporation (DTC) buses which pass from Kishangarh are:
 539 (Mehrauli - Nangloi)
 604 (Chhatarpur (Delhi Metro) Station - New Delhi railway station)
 605 (Mori Gate - Vasant Kunj Sector C-9)
 714 (Badarpur, Delhi M.B Road - Rajokri Harijan basti)
 715 (Mehrauli - Mangla Puri)
 717 (Badarpur, Delhi M.B Road - Shahabad Mohammadpur SMDP)

Accessibility

Kishangarh was largely considered to be a place cut off from the main city, but in recent years saw rapid progress in this aspect
with the Delhi Metro coming to close by Chattarpur and more bus routes added to the area by DTC. The transit to Delhi Metro station has also become easier via Metro feeder buses available at regular intervals.

The distance between Kishangarh Village and some prominent areas within the NCT of Delhi/New Delhi are as follows: -

 Kishangarh - Qutub Minar : 4 km
 Kishangarh - IGI Airport Terminal 7.5 km
 Kishangarh - Dwarka Sub City : 11 km
 Kishangarh - Chittaranjan Park : 13 km
 Kishangarh - AIIMS : 14 km
 Kishangarh - Lajpat Nagar : 16 km
 Kishangarh - Connaught Place : 17 km
 Kishangarh - Rajouri Garden : 18 km
 Kishangarh - Nizamuddin Railway Station : 20 km
 Kishangarh - New Delhi Railway Station : 23 km
 Kishangarh - Kashmere Gate : 25 km
 Kishangarh - Delhi University : 27 km
 Kishangarh - Rohini Sub City : 30 km
 Kishangarh - Delhi Singhu Border : 48 km
 Kishangarh - Bawana : 50 km

The distance between Kishangarh Village and some prominent areas in the Delhi NCR region are as follows: -

 Kishangarh - Gurgaon : 15 km
 Kishangarh - Noida : 27 km
 Kishangarh - Faridabad : 33 km
 Kishangarh - Ghaziabad : 46 km
 Kishangarh - Greater Noida : 57 km

The nearest metro station is at Chattarpur, situated at Andheria More on the arterial Mehrauli-Gurgaon Road which connects South West Delhi to the suburban area of Gurgaon.

Areas Near Kishangarh Village

 Mehrauli
 Vasant Kunj
 Vasant Vihar
 Munirka
 Saket
 Mahipalpur
 Masoodpur

See also
 South West Delhi district
 South Delhi district
 West Delhi district
 Areas And Zones of New Delhi

References 

 Villages in South West Delhi district
Mehrauli